Angelena Bonet (born Elena Louise Bennett; 13 May 1976) is an Australian model, actress, documentary filmmaker, and singer-songwriter.

Early life
Bonet was born on 13 May 1976 in Sydney as the youngest of five children to James Patrick Bennett, an IT/finance manager and Geraldine Louise Bennett, a physiotherapist specialising in children with neurodevelopmental disabilities. She was raised as a Catholic, in line with her father's beliefs, to which she later adopted the confirmation name 'Angela'.

Bonet attended Denistone East Primary School, Marist Sisters' College, Woolwich, then St. Patrick's College, Dundas.

Career

Modelling career
Bonet was discovered at a hair salon in Sydney at the age of 18 while attending Williams Business College for Travel & Tourism / Secretarial studies. She later debuted as Elli Bennet as a model for Vogue Australia magazine. Bonet modelled in major cities internationally and at home in Australia, where she was dubbed as an "Australian Supermodel" on Network Ten. She has been featured on the cover of Inside Sport magazine, FHM magazine, and served as a covergirl for the 'Sportsmodel of the Year' issue.

Film and television career
Bonet starred in several film and television productions, including the US TV Series JAG, Ghostly Encounters, My Husband My Killer, and Breakers, and also played the lead role in Canadian rock band Silverstein's film clip "American Dream". She was the featured host for NBC's AOF International Film Festival series and hosted the 'FIFA World Cup Show' in Canada (2010). She has also served as a judge in the Miss USA and Miss Teen USA Pageants in Vermont (2010), and has been the opener for the talk show "The Tonight Show with Jay Leno". Bonet has been featured on Australia's Network Seven Broadcast of The 6th Annual Foxtel AACTA Awards held at The Star, Sydney, Australia.

Music career
During her modelling career, Bonet began venturing into music and collaborated with her then-partner, Erick Deeby. Deeby became mentor to Bonet, and helped develop her sound whilst living in Kings Cross, Sydney. Following the death of Deeby, she moved to be with her family in Orange, NSW and composed the lyrics and melody to the instrumental pieces of music Deeby had written and recorded at his music studio for her. The song featured in her debut documentary film Angelena: Change The World and won 'Best Original Song' at the Indie Fest Film Awards (2017). She later independently released her EP "Tragic Fairytale" and "Angelena: Change The World" (Original Soundtrack Album) under her own Record and Publishing label Crystal Heart Records.

Personal life
Bonet was briefly engaged for three days to her musician/producer partner of five years, Erick Deeby, who died on 29 August 2007. She describes this experience as "soul shattering, but writing the music was cathartic and had a deep healing effect on her heart". She temporarily moved to Orange, NSW, to be with family and grieve.

She later settled in Toronto, Canada in 2010, and is now based in Sydney and Toronto. Despite her Catholic upbringing, Bonet is a daily yoga and meditation practitioner and cites her beliefs to be more spiritual in nature.

Kidnap and post-traumatic stress disorder
While visiting Melbourne in May 2012, Bonet was kidnapped and gang raped, but survived attempted murder. She suffered post-traumatic stress disorder as a consequence, and shortly after, retired from modelling to focus her energies and dedicate her life to philanthropy and women's rights issues. A name change was recommended by law enforcement to preserve her personal safety after the murder-attempt on 26 May 2012. Bonet adopted a combination of her birth name 'Elena' and her confirmation name 'Angela' to become 'Angelena' and adopted the surname 'Bonet'.

Charitable efforts 
Bonet is an official volunteer blogger for Oxfam Australia and a member of the RAINN Org Speakers Bureau. She has also campaigned for women's rights, particularly through V-Day One Billion and United State of Women. She has served as an ambassador for World Mental Health Day and was a speaker for the RUOK? Day (Suicide Prevention Initiative for teens) in 2013. She has an online journalistic program that interviews women and girls worldwide in an effort to share their stories.In early 2017, Angelena established a non-profit organisation, Crystal Heart Foundation aimed at supporting women and girl survivors of sexual violence and those suffering from post-traumatic stress disorder, whilst raising public awareness and aiding other charities globally.

Filmography

Film

Television

Awards and nominations

References

External links
 
 

21st-century Australian actresses
Australian female models
Models from Sydney
Australian women's rights activists
Living people
1976 births
Australian women composers
Australian women singer-songwriters
Australian women film producers
Australian documentary film directors
Australian journalists
21st-century Australian singers
21st-century Australian women singers
Women documentary filmmakers